The African Peer Review Mechanism (APRM) is a mutually agreed instrument voluntarily acceded to by the member states of the African Union (AU) as a self-monitoring mechanism. It was founded in 2003.

The mandate of the APRM is to encourage conformity with regards to political, economic and corporate governance values, codes and standards, among African countries and the objectives in socio-economic development as well as to ensure monitoring and evaluation of AU Agenda 2063 and SDGs 2030.

Africa's self-assessment for good governance 

A Specialized Agency of the African Union (AU), the African Peer Review Mechanism (APRM) was initiated in 2002 and established in 2003 by the African Union in the framework of the implementation of the New Partnership for Africa's Development (NEPAD).

APRM is a tool for sharing experiences, reinforcing best practices, identifying deficiencies, and assessing capacity-building needs to foster policies, standards and practices that lead to political stability, high economic growth, sustainable development and accelerated sub-regional and continental economic integration.

Member countries within the APRM undertake self-monitoring in all aspects of their governance and socio-economic development. African Union (AU) stakeholders participate in the self-assessment of all branches of government – executive, legislative and judicial – as well as the private sector, civil society and the media. The APRM Review Process gives member states a space for national dialogue on governance and socio-economic indicators and an opportunity to build consensus on the way forward.

The APR Forum of Heads of State and Government adopted the 2016-2020 Strategic Plan and the APRM Statute at the 25th Summit of the APR Forum held in Nairobi, Kenya. The 28th AU Assembly of Heads of States and Government further extended the APRM's mandate to include tracking of the implementation and overseeing the Continent's key governance initiatives.  In addition, the AU Assembly further extended the mandate of the APRM to include monitoring of the implementation of the African Union (AU) Agenda 2063 and United Nations Sustainable Development Goals (SDGs), Agenda 2030.

In 2018, the 11th AU Extraordinary Summit of Head of States and Government reached the decision to fully integrate the APRM to the African Union in accordance to Assembly/AU/Dec.635(XXVIII) decision adopted by 28th Ordinary Session of the Assembly Union held in Addis Ababa. The Assembly further encouraged the universal accession of AU member countries to the APRM, now counting 40 members with the accession of the Republic of Seychelles and Zimbabwe at the 32nd APR Forum in Addis Ababa, Ethiopia, in January 2020.

Four types of country reviews
1. Base Review – carried out immediately after a country becomes a member of the APRM

2. Periodic Review every four years

3. Targeted Review – requested by the member country itself outside the framework of mandated reviews

4. A Review commissioned by the APR Forum when there are early signs of pending political and economic crisis.

Four Thematic Areas 
1. Democracy and Political Governance (DPG)

2. Economic Governance and Management (EGM)

3. Corporate Governance (CG)

4. Broad-based Sustainable Socio-economic Development (SED)

The five stages of a peer review

Consultation 

The APR Secretariat and the Country under review consult on the process overview and terms of the Memorandum of Understanding (MoU). The Country under review creates a Focal Point to liaise with the Secretariat and provide it with relevant laws, treaty ratifications, budgets and development plans. The Secretariat prepares a background assessment document. At the same time, the Country under review independently completes the APR Self-Assessment Questionnaire, gathers inputs from civil society and drafts a paper outlining the nation's issues and a National Programme of Action (NPoA) with clear steps and deadlines on how it plans to conform to APRM codes and standards, the African Union Charter, and UN obligations. The Country Review Team that is set up writes a report outlining issues to be focused on during the review mission.

2. THE REVIEW MISSION

Visits the Country under review and conducts broad-based consultations with government, officials, political parties, parliamentarians, and representatives of civil society organisations (e.g. media, academia, trade unions, professional bodies), and the private sector. The mission typically lasts two-and-a-half to three weeks.

3. DRAFT REPORT

The APR Country Review Team drafts a report on the Country under review.

4.THE PEER REVIEW

takes place at the level of the APR Forum, using the APR Panel's report on the team's findings as a basis. The APR Forum discusses these recommendations with the Reviewed Country's leadership.

5. FINAL REPORT

Within six months, after the peer review, the published Country Review Report must be tabled in sub-regional institutions (Pan-African Parliament, African Commission on Human and Peoples' Rights, AU Peace and Security Council, Economic, Social and Cultural Council of the African Union [ECOSOCC AU]). The report is then made publicly available.

The second generation review 
The objective of the APRM Second Generation Review is to assess progress made in Governance and Socio-economic Development in Member States in the period since the Base Review. The specific objectives are to:

 reinvigorate, rationalize and institutionalize the APRM in governance reforms within a Member States.
 appraise to what extent the National Programme of Action (NPoA) is implemented and its continued relevance, on the basis of which a new NPOA with a few key actions will be proposed;
 facilitate the development of a second NPOA with greater focus and based only on key actions; and
make the APRM Review process more relevant to citizens' needs, more cost-effective and in tune with the Agenda 2063 priorities and goals.

What happens after the country review
The National Programme of Action (NPoA) is divided into short-term, medium-term and long-term goals and is continuously monitored by the National Governance Commission/Governing Council, or a smaller body of state and non-state representatives. Progress Reports on implementation are presented annually to the APR Forum. The APR Secretariat follows up on commitments made, holds regional workshops to share best practices identified in the reviews, and offers technical support to fulfill APRM plans.

Governing bodies of the APRM

APR FORUM 

(Committee of Participating Heads of State and Government)

Highest decision-making authority.

APR PANEL

(Panel of Eminent Persons)

Oversees the review process to ensure its independence, professionalism and credibility, and reports to the Forum. The APR Panel is also responsible for selecting and appointing and the Review Teams.

COMMITTEE OF FOCAL POINTS

Committee of representatives of Heads of State and Government

Manages the budgetary process, resource mobilisation through Member States, Strategic and Development Partners, and the APRM Trust Fund and Audit.

National Governing Council (NGC)

The National Governance Commission/National Governing Council (NGC) is the body that oversees implementation of the APRM process at the Member State level. In addition to providing guidance in terms of policy direction, the NGC ensures professionalism, credibility and independence of the national APRM self-assessment and review processes. The NGC is composed of key stakeholder groups from government, civil society and the private sector, in line with the APRM principle of broad-based participation.

APRM SECRETARIAT

Provides technical, coordinating and administrative support services. It must have sufficient capacity for the analytical work that underpins the peer review process.

Membership of the APRM

Membership of the APRM is voluntary and open to all African Union (AU) countries. Accession begins with an expression of interest in membership followed by the signing of a Memorandum of Understanding (MoU) between the country and the APR Forum.

Strategic Partners
The APRM has entered into special support agreements with partner institutions designated by the Forum as Strategic Partners. These are: African Capacity Building Foundation (ACBF), the African Development Bank (AfDB); Mo Ibrahim Foundation; United Nations Economic Commission for Africa (UNECA); Office of the Special Advisor on Africa (OSAA); United Nations Development Programme (UNDP) Regional Bureau for Africa.

See also

New Partnership for Africa's Development
African Unions

Bibliography

APRM documents
 APRM Base document The APRM base document
 Memorandum of Understanding on the APRM The Memorandum of Understanding (MOU)
 Guidelines Guidelines for Countries to prepare for and participate in the APRM
 Organisation and Processes Organisation and Processes
 The objectives, standards, criteria and indicators for the APRM. Retrieved 27 May 2006.
The Africa Governance Report 2019

Critiques and studies of the APRM process
 An Analysis of the Implementation of the African Peer Review Mechanism in Ghana, Kenya and Mauritius Grant Masterson, EISA, February 2005
 NEPAD’s APRM: A Progress Report, Practical Limitations and Challenges Paper by Ayesha Kajee on the APRM, 2004, retrieved 27 May 2006.
 Becoming my brother's keeper eAfrica October 2003 by Ross Herbert, retrieved 27 May 2006.
 The APRM process in Kenya: A pathway to a new state? Report by OSIEA/AfriMAP, April 2007
 Critical review of the African Peer Review Mechanism Process in Rwanda Report by Ligue des Droits de la Personne dans la Région des Grands Lacs (LDGL), January 2007
Between Hope and Scepticism: Civil Society and the African Peer Review Mechanism Partnership Africa Canada, October 2005
Strategies for promoting effective stakeholder participation in the African Peer Review Mechanism, UNECA, 2005
Inadequately Self-Critical: Rwanda’s Self-Assessment for the African Peer Review Mechanism Eduard Jordaan, African Affairs, April 2006
Effective Stakeholder Participation. in the APRM Process for the Promotion. of Democratic Governance:. A Case Study of Ghana, Eric Opoku, UNDP, December 2006
Ghana and the APRM: A Critical Assessment, Adotey Bing-Pappoe, AfriMAP & OSIWA, June 2007
The African Peer Review Mechanism in Mauritius: Lessons from Phase I Sheila Bunwaree, AfriMAP & OSISA, August 2007
Further analysis of the African Peer Review Mechanism and the ECA/OECD-DAC Mutual Review of Development Effectiveness in the context of NEPAD Report to the UN High Level Task Force on the Implementation of the Right to Development, January 2008
 The African Peer Review Mechanism: Lessons from the Pioneers, Ross Herbert and Steven Gruzd, South African Institute of International Affairs, March 2008
Civil Society Participation in Uganda’s APRM Process Juliet Nakato Odoi, SAIIA, June 2008
Assessing South Africa’s APRM: An NGO Perspective, Nick Hutchings, Mukelani Dimba, and Alison Tilley, SAIIA, June 2008
Addressing the African Peer Review Mechanism's Programmes of Action, Faten Aggad, SAIIA, June 2008
Understanding APRM Research: Planning, Process and Politics. A Practical Handbook for Peer Review Research, George Katito, SAIIA, June 2008
The African Peer Review Process in Nigeria, Adele Jinadu, AfriMAP, August 2008
Benin and the African Peer Review Mechanism: Consolidating Democratic Achievements Gilles Badet, AfriMAP, August 2008
Making the News: Why the APRM Didn't, Brendan Boyle, SAIIA, September 2008
Media Freedom, Transparency and Governance, Raymond Louw, SAIIA, September 2008

African Union
Development in Africa
New Partnership for Africa's Development
Peer review